Dolichoderus affectus is an extinct species of ant in the genus Dolichoderus. Described by Théobald in 1937, the fossils were discovered in France.

References

†
Oligocene insects
Prehistoric insects of Europe
Fossil taxa described in 1937
Fossil ant taxa
Fossils of France
 01